Vernand-Camarès railway station is a railway station in the municipality of Lausanne, in the Swiss canton of Vaud. Although located in Lausanne, Vernand-Camarès and neighboring  are part of the  exclave, some distance from the city itself.

Services 
 the following services stop at Vernand-Camarès:

References

External links 
 
 

Railway stations in the canton of Vaud
Lausanne–Echallens–Bercher Railway stations
Transport in Lausanne